The Literary Mind and the Carving of Dragons is a 5th-century work on Chinese literary aesthetics by Liu Xie, composed in fifty chapters (篇) according to the principles of numerology and divination found in the Book of Changes or I Ching.  The work also draws on and argues against the 3rd century author Lu Ji's work the Wen fu文賦 ("On Literature"). Liu Xie wished to give a complete and internally consistent account of literature. One of his ideas is that affections are the medium of literature, and language merely the product.

Translations

References 
 A Chinese literary mind: culture, creativity and rhetoric in Wenxin Diaolong, 2001 (Zong-qi Cai, ed.).
 Owen, Stephen. Readings in Chinese literary thought. No. 30. Harvard Univ Asia Center, 1992.
 Richter, Antje. "Notions of Epistolarity in Liu Xie's Wenxin dialong." Journal of the American Oriental Society 127.2 (2007), pp. 143-160.
 Zhao, Heping. "Wen Xin Diao Long": An early Chinese rhetoric of written discourse.  Purdue University. ProQuest Dissertations Publishing, 1990. 9301248.

External links 

 Wen Xin Diao Long – Full text (traditional/UTF-8) from Project Gutenberg
 《文心雕龍》.  – Chinese text in GB/Simplified characters from the website "Sinology," (國學).
 The Literary Mind and the Carving of Dragons  《文心雕龍》 Chinese text with (partial) matching English vocabulary (Chinese Notes Digital Library) 

Chinese classic texts
5th-century Chinese books
Academic works about literary theory
Aesthetics literature